Purple on Time is the fifth album by U.S. Maple. It was released on November 4, 2003 on Drag City.

The Album
According to singer Al Johnson, the album's title is meant to elicit connotations of emotion, as, to him, purple is an emotional color. The "on time" aspect of the title is meant to evoke sexual associations related to climax.  Al Johnson describes the records as a "love record," and contends that the band intended to make an album of love songs, but their intention went unnoticed.

Track listing 
 "My Lil' Shocker" (U.S. Maple) – 5:07 
 "Sweet & Center" (U.S. Maple) – 4:40 
 "Oh Below" (U.S. Maple) – 4:35 
 "I'm Just a Bag" (U.S. Maple) – 3:16 
 "Dumb in the Wings" (U.S. Maple) – 4:42 
 "Whoopee Invader" (U.S. Maple) – 4:38 
 "Lay Lady Lay" (Dylan) – 5:19 
 "Tan Loves Blue" (U.S. Maple) – 3:16 
 "Untitled" (U.S. Maple) – 0:45 
 "Touch Me Judge" (U.S. Maple) – 3:44

Credits
Al Johnson – Vocals
Mark Shippy – Guitar
Todd Rittmann – Guitar
Adam Vida – Drums

References
 Day, Holly. A Cosmic Quikie with...U.S. Maple "www.cosmik.com". 2004. Accessed May 18, 2007.

2003 albums
U.S. Maple albums
Drag City (record label) albums